Stroe is a hamlet in the Dutch province of North Holland.

Stroe is considered part of Hippolytushoef. It has place name signs. Stroe was home to 175 people in 1840. It used to have a church, but it was demolished in the late-19th century. There were also a clandestine Mennonite church in farm, but it burnt down in 1934.

References

Populated places in North Holland
Hollands Kroon